The 2006–07 Arab Champions League saw the 4th edition of Arab Champions League. 32 teams represented Arab nations from Africa and Asia. ES Sétif of Algeria won the final against Al-Faisaly SC of Jordan.

The System 
 Round 32: Knock out stage
 Round 16: Knock out stage
 Round 8: Two groups of four
 Semifinals and final: Knock out stage

Round of 32 
32 teams play home and away matches as Knock out stage.

Round of 16
16 teams play home and away matches as Knock out stage

Group stage

Group A

Results

Group B

Results

Semi-finals

Matches

Final

Matches

Champions

External links
Arab Champions' League 2006/07 – rsssf.com

Arab Champions League, 2006-07
Arab Champions League, 2006-07
Arab Champions League, 2007-08
Arab Champions League, 2007-08
Arab Club Champions Cup